Monkey Puzzle may refer to:

 Araucaria araucana, the monkey puzzle tree, a species of conifer
 Rathinda amor, a species of butterfly
 Monkey Puzzle (band), an a cappella music group
 The Monkey Puzzle (UFO album)
 The Monkey Puzzle (The Saints album), 1981 
 Monkey Puzzle (book), a 2000 illustrated children's book by Julia Donaldson and Axel Scheffler
 Monkey Puzzle (film), a 2008 Australian film
 Monkey Puzzle, Sia's vanity record label
 "Monkey Puzzle Tree", a song by Lucia Cifarelli from her 2003 album From the Land of Volcanos